Shakir Shikhaliyev (born 19 November 1990) is an Azerbaijani gymnast. He competed at the 2012 Summer Olympics.

References

External links
 

1990 births
Living people
Azerbaijani male artistic gymnasts
Olympic gymnasts of Azerbaijan
Gymnasts at the 2012 Summer Olympics
Sportspeople from Baku